The 1979–80 All-Ireland Senior Club Hurling Championship was the 10th staging of the All-Ireland Senior Club Hurling Championship, the Gaelic Athletic Association's premier inter-county club hurling tournament. The championship began on 7 October 1979 and ended on 1 June 1980.

Blackrock were the defending champions, however, they were defeated by Castlegar in the All-Ireland semi-final.

On 1 June 1980, Castlegar won the championship after a 1-11 to 1-08 defeat of McQuillan's in the All-Ireland final.

Frank Keenan from the Camross club was the championship's top scorer with 4-17.

Results

Connacht Senior Club Hurling Championship

First round

Semi-finalFinalLeinster Senior Club Hurling ChampionshipFirst roundQuarter-finalsSemi-finalsFinalMunster Senior Club Hurling ChampionshipQuarter-finalsSemi-finalsFinalUlster Senior Club Hurling ChampionshipSemi-finalFinalAll-Ireland Senior Club Hurling ChampionshipQuarter-finalsSemi-finalsFinal'''

Championship statistics

Top scorers

Top scorers overall

Miscellaneous

 Blackrock of Cork set the all-time record by winning a fifth Munster title.
 Crumlin become the first team from Dublin to win the Leinster title.
 The All-Ireland final between Castlegar and McQuillan's was a unique affair as it was the first final to feature teams from Connacht and Ulster. Castlegar win the All-Ireland for the first time in their history, thus becoming the first Connacht team to win the title.

References

1979 in hurling
1980 in hurling
All-Ireland Senior Club Hurling Championship